Weta is an unincorporated community in Jackson County, in the U.S. state of South Dakota.

History
Weta got its start in 1907 when the Milwaukee Railroad was extended to that point. A post office called Weta was established in 1908, and remained in operation until 1939.

References

Unincorporated communities in Jackson County, South Dakota
Populated places established in 1907
1907 establishments in South Dakota
Unincorporated communities in South Dakota